The Roxy Pro Gold Coast 2017 was an event of the Association of Surfing Professionals for 2017 World Surf League.

This event was held from 14 to 25 March at Gold Coast, (Queensland, Australia) and contested by 36 surfers.

The tournament was won by S. Gilmore (AUS), who beat Lakey Peterson (US) in final.

Round 1

Round 2

Round 3

Round 4

Quarter-finals

Semi-finals

Final

References

Surfing competitions
2017 World Surf League
2017 in Australian sport
2017 in Australian women's sport
Sport on the Gold Coast, Queensland
Women's surfing